is a Japanese four-panel manga by Cherry-Arai. The strip was serialized in Ichijinsha's Manga 4-Koma Palette magazine from April 2009 to February 2022, when it was transferred to Monthly Comic Rex upon that magazine ceasing publication. An anime television series adaptation by Doga Kobo aired in Japan between January and March 2014.

Plot
Kobeni Yonomori is a high school girl who lives with her mother and older sister Benio. Upon turning sixteen, Kobeni is shocked to learn that, due to an arrangement by her late grandfather, she is engaged to a boy named Hakuya Mitsumine who, along with his little sister Mashiro, come to live with Kobeni. As Kobeni spends time adjusting to this new family, she learns there is more to Hakuya and Mashiro than meets the eye. Soon, Kobeni's life becomes a bit more interesting between having a fiancé, a new sister-in-law, and a crazy sister.

Characters

A responsible sixteen-year-old who handles cooking and chores well. When she was younger, she fell down a cliff but was saved by Hakuya. The incident left her with a scar and little memory of the event, as she does not remember Hakuya when they meet again. Over time she recalls more of her memories of the incident, later learning she had received half of Hakuya's inhuman power, the side effect of which gives her a fever on occasion. In school she is noted for her cute face, large bust and (as Mashiro puts it) "child-bearing hips" (which she is conscious of). She is also very conscious of the unwanted attention she receives for being the student council president's younger sister. She begins to seriously date Hakuya later on in the series and go out on formal dates, although she is very nervous any time they do.

Kobeni's older sister, who is the student council president at her school. She is both a siscon and a lolicon, and is incredibly doting on both Kobeni, who has gotten used to it, and Mashiro, who fears her greatly. She is quite popular at school, often putting on a more refined personality than at home. In school, she is called Benio-sama. She is protective of Kobeni as she feels somewhat responsible for what happened.

Hakuya's younger sister, who was able to enroll in Kobeni's class despite being nine years old by using a hypnosis-like power to fit into the crowd. She often complains that she is not a child despite being no older than ten, but her true feelings regarding her likes and dislikes can be easily read by the others. She is quite fearful of Benio but is easily swayed by sweet things. She also has a fear of aliens and UMAs but becomes intrigued by the latter when she discovers toy models of them inside some chocolates.

Kobeni's arranged fiancé and Mashiro's older brother. A quiet but kind-hearted boy who silently helps out Kobeni when he can, though is sometimes slow to catch onto things, and is not bothered at all with their arranged marriage, as he truly likes her. When they were younger he saved Kobeni's life after she fell down a cliff and blames himself for failing to prevent it. He injured his right eye in the accident, causing him to lose part of his vision. As a result, he grows his bangs long to cover up the scar. He has a hobby of constructing models of historical buildings from matchsticks, which are often ruined by Mashiro. It is later revealed that he is an Inugami, who gave half of his power to Kobeni to save her life. His usually expressionless face makes him a person hard to read, even to his family. Kobeni, however, seems to be an exception. He begins to seriously date Kobeni later on in the series and go on formal dates out.

Kobeni's classmate and best friend, whose family runs a big chocolate factory.

The student council vice-president, who often has to keep Benio's urges in check.

The student council's secretary, she greatly admires and is fond of Benio just like everyone else at school (with a few exceptions: Mashiro, etc.) and is jealous towards Kobeni and Mashiro because they both live with her. She comes from the same species as Mashiro and Hakuya and seems keen on getting Hakuya to marry her because her mother told her to not miss the chance of claiming a male of their species due to their rarity.

Konoha's close friend and a member of the school's newspaper club, who is always on the lookout for a scoop to get herself promoted to the position of editor-in-chief.

Kobeni and Benio's mother, who is often busy working.

Mashiro and Hakuya's mother, who is petite and looks young for her age. She is easily distracted by sweet things and tends to blurt out important information casually. She is the one who casually lets slip that the Mitsumine clan is not human.

Mashiro and Hakuya's cousin, and Arata's younger sister. Ui has the ability to turn into a cat. And unlike Mashiro, Ui enjoys playing with Benio, even calling her "Benio-tan."

Mashiro and Hakuya's cousin, and Ui's older brother. Arata is a sixth grader. Konoha's mother has arranged an omiai (marriage meeting) between Arata and Konoha.

Media

Manga
Engaged to the Unidentified began as a four-panel manga series made by Cherry-Arai and published by Ichijinsha. The first chapter was released on April 22, 2009, in the Manga 4-Koma Palette (at the time Manga 4-Koma Kings Palette) magazine's June 2009 issue. On February 27, 2022, Manga 4-Koma Palette ceased publication, and the manga was transferred to Monthly Comic Rex the following month. The series has been collected in thirteen tankōbon volumes since July 22, 2010, the latest of which was published on April 21, 2022. The fourth volume was released simultaneously with a limited edition on December 28, 2013. Bundled with it was a DVD with an animated music clip of the song  performed by Haruka Terui, Eriko Matsui and Yuri Yoshida. An original video animation was released with the limited edition of the fifth volume.

Volume list

Anime
An anime television series aired in Japan on ABC channel from January 8 to March 26, 2014. The series was directed by Yoshiyuki Fujiwara at studio Doga Kobo with script by Fumihiko Shimo and character design by Ai Kikuchi, who was also the chief animation director. Besides ABC, the anime also aired on AT-X, Tokyo MX and BS11 and was simulcast with English subtitles by Crunchyroll and through select digital outlets by Sentai Filmworks. (group formed by voice actresses Eriko Matsui, Haruka Terui, and Yuri Yoshida). The series was released in Japan in 6 DVD and Blu-ray Disc volumes between March 19 and August 20, 2014. The first volume contains a 12-minute-long original video animation episode. A 10-minute-long original video animation (OVA) episode was released on March 28, 2014, bundled with the limited edition of the fifth tankōbon volume of the manga.

Episode list

OVAs

Works cited
 "Ch." is shortened form for chapter and refers to a chapter number of the Engaged to the Unidentified manga
 "Ep." is shortened form for episode and refers to an episode number of the Engaged to the Unidentified anime

References

External links
 

Anime series based on manga
Doga Kobo
Ichijinsha manga
Marriage in anime and manga
Romantic comedy anime and manga
Seinen manga
Sentai Filmworks
Shōnen manga
Supernatural anime and manga
Toho Animation
Yonkoma